Brimfield (formerly Charleston) is a village in Peoria County, Illinois, United States.

The population was 868 at the 2010 census.  Brimfield is part of the Peoria, Illinois Metropolitan Statistical Area.

Geography
Brimfield is located at  (40.838210, -89.883999).

Demographics

As of the census of 2000, there were 933 people, 362 households, and 245 families residing in the village. The racial makeup of the village was 98.50% White, 0.32% Native American, 0.21% from other races, and 0.96% from two or more races. Hispanic or Latino of any race were 0.75% of the population.

There were 362 households, out of which 37.0% had children under the age of 18 living with them, 55.2% were married couples living together, 10.2% had a female householder with no husband present, and 32.3% were non-families. 27.1% of all households were made up of individuals, and 11.9% had someone living alone who was 65 years of age or older. The average household size was 2.57 and the average family size was 3.18.

In the village, the population was spread out, with 0% under the age of 18, 0% from 18 to 24, 0% from 25 to 44, 0% from 45 to 64, and 100% who were 65 years of age or older. The median age was 34 years. For every 100 females, there were 96.4 males. For every 100 females age 18 and over, there were 84.2 males.

The median income for a household in the city was $38,542, and the median income for a family was $42,083. Males had a median income of $36,250 versus $23,068 for females. The per capita income for the city was $16,090. About 6.6% of families and 8.5% of the population were below the poverty line, including 11.3% of those under age 18 and 1.8% of those age 65 or over.

Schools
Brimfield has both schools in Brimfield Community Unit School District 309: Brimfield Grade School and Brimfield High School.

References

Villages in Peoria County, Illinois
Villages in Illinois
Peoria metropolitan area, Illinois